Tøyen Station is a railway station located in Oslo on the Gjøvik Line. It is located in the borough of Grünerløkka and is the first stop on the line after Oslo Central Station. The station was opened in 1904. It is a small unmanned station which is only served by local trains by Vy Gjøvikbanen. It is 4.45 km from Oslo S.

1400 meters from the railway station is the metro station with the same name, located on the Oslo Metro. There is no tram/metro/train connection between the two stations. There is a bus route, 60, from Tøyen to Tøyen stasjon.

External links
Entry at the Norwegian Railway Club

Railway stations in Oslo
Railway stations on the Gjøvik Line
Railway stations opened in 1904
1904 establishments in Norway